"Leck mich im Arsch" is a song by Insane Clown Posse and Jack White. The lyrics are inspired by Leck mich im Arsch, a scatological canon by Wolfgang Amadeus Mozart (K. 231/382c), while the music is based on a canon called Leck mir den Arsch fein recht schön sauber (K. 233/382d). The latter has for two centuries been attributed to Mozart but evidence has shown that the music of the piece was composed by Wenzel Trnka and Mozart merely replaced the original lyrics with his own.

Background
In August 2011, Insane Clown Posse was contacted by Jack White, who invited Joseph Bruce and Joseph Utsler to his mansion, because he wanted to collaborate with them. White played the track he was working on, an arrangement of Wolfgang Amadeus Mozart's "Leck mich im Arsch" with live instrumentation by JEFF the Brotherhood, for Bruce and Utsler and explained that the title of the track translated to "Lick My Ass".

Insane Clown Posse were surprised that White wanted to work with them, and said that they had respect for White, who is also from Detroit. Violent J said, "The most respected musician in the world and one of the most hated musicians in the world. We didn't expect that call, brother. I told him, 'I gotta know—why us?'. He said, 'I find myself going to your web site and looking at it. Some stuff I think is genius, some stuff I don't understand at all, but I always find myself going back there and seeing what you're up to."

Song information
Bruce perceived that the scatological nature of the composition was the reason why White asked Bruce and Utsler to appear on the song, but once White explained Mozart's sense of humor, they became excited to work on it. Insane Clown Posse went back to their hotel room to write their lyrics, and returned to record with White and JEFF the Brotherhood in White's home recording studio. Bruce and Utsler's vocals were recorded in one take. Insane Clown Posse said that the song was a collaboration and that White asked them for their feedback throughout the recording process. The song was released as a single on September 13, 2011 by White's label Third Man Records.

References

German profanity
2011 singles
Insane Clown Posse songs
Songs written by Jack White
Jack White songs
2011 songs
Off-color humor
Third Man Records singles
Works about feces